Michael Paul Lookinland (born December 19, 1960) is an American actor and cameraman. He is best known for his role as the youngest brother, Bobby Brady, on the ABC sitcom The Brady Bunch from 1969 to 1974, and all of its sequels and spinoffs.

Early life 
Lookinland was born in Mount Pleasant, Utah to Paul (a principal at Steven White Junior High, Carson, California) and Karen Lookinland. Paul and Karen were residing in the Los Angeles area, but they were visiting family in Spring City over Christmas break 1960 when Michael was born. His grandfather was an administrator at LDS Hospital. He has two siblings: sister Theresa and brother Todd, who starred in The Blue Bird with Elizabeth Taylor. Todd would later appear in a Brady Bunch episode that served as the pilot for a spin-off series, Kelly's Kids, about a husband and wife with three boys: one white, one black, and one Asian. The series was not bought.

Michael was raised as a member of the Church of Jesus Christ of Latter-day Saints. He began working as an actor at age seven. By age nine, he had appeared in numerous television commercials for such products as toys, Cheerios cereal, and Band-Aid bandages.

Career 

Lookinland was a TV-commercial actor before he was cast in The Brady Bunch, having done around thirty commercials. He had been offered two roles - Eddie on The Courtship of Eddie's Father and Bobby on The Brady Bunch; his parents chose the latter, feeling it would be healthier for him to be around other children closer to his age rather than an only child on an all-adult cast (the role of Eddie eventually went to Brandon Cruz). He has naturally sandy-colored, wavy hair. Because his hair color did not match TV-siblings Peter's or Greg's natural dark brown color, his was dyed dark brown and straightened. Occasionally, the lights on set were so hot that his dye would run down his face. During the last two seasons of The Brady Bunch, his natural hair color was allowed to show.

Lookinland provided the voice of Oblio in the 1971 animated film The Point!. Shortly after the final season of The Brady Bunch wrapped filming, he appeared alongside Jennifer Jones and Paul Newman in the 1974 disaster film blockbuster The Towering Inferno and on the 1970s TV show The Secrets of Isis.

Lookinland continued to reprise his role as Bobby Brady in the show's many sequels and spin-offs. In 1976, he was uninterested in participating in The Brady Bunch Hour, so he asked for double the offered salary in hopes his role would be recast, however, instead his request was accepted and resulted in increased salaries for all cast members. He also reprised his role in the 1981 TV movie The Brady Girls Get Married, the 1988 Christmas special A Very Brady Christmas and again in the 1990 sequel series The Bradys, in which Bobby Brady was involved in a racing-car accident, which made him a wheelchair user throughout the series. Lookinland spent several years as a television camera operator and made an uncredited appearance in the 2000 TV movie Growing Up Brady as a  camera operator filming an episode of The Brady Bunch. He also joined with the other Brady Bunch cast in the 2019 television series A Very Brady Renovation on HGTV.

Having left show business, Lookinland operates a business (as of 2019) that makes decorative concrete in Salt Lake City, Utah. In 2021, Lookinland returned to the world of acting by starring in the Lifetime Christmas movie, Blending Christmas, alongside his Brady Bunch co-stars Barry Williams, Christopher Knight, Susan Olsen, and Robbie Rist.

In 2022, Lookinland, Knight, and Williams competed in season eight of The Masked Singer as "Mummies". They were eliminated on "TV Theme Night" alongside Daymond John as "Fortune Teller".

Personal life 
Lookinland graduated from Chadwick School in 1978, an independent school located in Palos Verdes Peninsula in Los Angeles, California. During the Brady Bunch years, he also attended Hollywood Professional School alongside his TV siblings Maureen McCormick, Christopher Knight and Susan Olsen. After graduating from high school, Lookinland wanted to leave Los Angeles, so he moved to Salt Lake City, Utah to attend the University of Utah, but dropped out in order to pursue a career as a production assistant and camera operator.

He wed on May 1, 1987, Kelly Wermuth (born 1962), an occasional actress. Together, they have two children, sons Scott Michael Lookinland (born July 6, 1990), who portrayed him in Growing Up Brady (2000), and Joseph Kelly "Joe" Lookinland (born August 6, 1993), both born in Utah. The two worked together, with Lookinland as a production assistant and Wermuth as an extra on Halloween 4: The Return of Michael Myers and Halloween 5: The Revenge of Michael Myers.

Lookinland is a self-described Deadhead, having attended more than 100 Grateful Dead concerts and shows. In 1989, the California skate rock band Wonderful Broken Thing recorded their debut full-length album "Looking For Mike Lookinland"; several songs from this album were featured on the H-Street video "Hokus Pokus."

On November 9, 1997, shortly after 7:30 p.m., after leaving the set of the TV series Promised Land in St. George, Utah, where he worked as first assistant cameraman, Lookinland was driving in his 1990 Ford Bronco on Utah State Route 18, 35 miles north of St. George, when he looked down to adjust the radio as he was approaching a curve and drifted onto the left shoulder. He then overcorrected when trying to steer back onto the pavement and rolled at least two times off the right side of the road. His blood alcohol content was 0.258, more than three times over Utah's legal limit of 0.08. After being treated for cuts and bruises at Dixie Regional Medical Center, he was booked into Washington County Jail, but released on a $1,550 bail. In December, he completed court-ordered rehabilitation service and on May 27, 1998, was sentenced to 24 hours of community service and fined $1,500. He cited this incident as having inspired him to stop drinking.

Filmography

Film

Television

References

External links 
 
 Just Add Water Custom Concrete
 The Smoking Gun: Mike Lookinland Arrested

1960 births
20th-century American male actors
21st-century American male actors
American male child actors
American male film actors
American male television actors
American male voice actors
Businesspeople from Salt Lake City
Latter Day Saints from Utah
Living people
Male actors from Utah
People from Mount Pleasant, Utah